The Vienna School of Fantastic Realism is a group of artists founded in Vienna in 1946. It includes Ernst Fuchs, Maître Leherb (Helmut Leherb), Arik Brauer, Wolfgang Hutter and Anton Lehmden, all students of Professor Albert Paris Gütersloh at the Vienna Academy of Fine Arts where also Zeev Kun studied in Gütersloh's class. It was Gütersloh's emphasis on the techniques of the Old Masters that gave the fantastic realist painters a grounding in realism (expressed with a clarity and detail some have compared to early Flemish painting) combined with religious and esoteric symbolism. Older members of the group were Rudolf Hausner, Kurt Regschek and Fritz Janschka who emigrated to the US in 1949. Kurt Regschek, who helped to organize the early exhibitions of the group left it in 1965. Hausner, Fuchs, Hutter, Brauer and Lehmden were referred to as "The Big Five" who subsequently held successful exhibitions worldwide with international recognition from 1965 onward.

Books
 1974: Die Wiener Schule des Phantastischen Realismus (C. Bertelsmann) (Johann Muschik)  
 2005: Fantastic Art (Taschen)(Schurian, Prof. Dr. Walter)  (English edition)
 2003: Die Phantasten – Die Wiener Schule des Phantastischen Realisums (Stdtgemeinde Tulln) 
 2007: Metamorphosis (beinArt) 
 2008: Phantastischer Realismus (Belvedere, Wien)

See also
 Visionary art

External links 
 The Vienna School of Fantastic Realism
 Kurt Regschek (German Wikipedia)

1946 establishments in Austria
Academy of Fine Arts Vienna
Art movements
Arts organizations established in 1946
Austrian art
Austrian artist groups and collectives
Fantastic realism